The Roman Catholic Diocese of Middelburg was a short-lived (1559-1603) Latin Catholic suffragan diocese in the ecclesiastical province of the Archbishop of Utrecht, with episcopal see at Middelburg, on Walcheren (former) island in the Dutch Zeeland province.

History 

Established on 12 May 1559 as Diocese of Middelburg on territory, covering the southwestern Dutch province of Zeeland (Dutch Sea land, at the North Sea coast and estuaries of the great rivers Rijn = Rhine, Schelde = Escaut and Maas = Meuse), canonically split-off from the huge, France-based Diocese of Cambrai, which was simultaneously promoted an Archdiocese, like the then Diocese of Utrecht, which became Middelburg's Metropolitan.

In 1603, during the Eighty Years War (when Habsburg lost most northern territory; including Middelburg after a long siege), the bishopric was suppressed, without a formal successor, its territory being included in the pre-diocesan Dutch Mission 'Batavia', while its incumbent was transferred to the richer, safer see of Bruges in Flanders (Dutch-speaking part of the countshin in the northwest of Belgium).

The 1803.03.22 establishment of the Apostolic Vicariate of Breda (later enlarged and promoted to bishopric), including the same territory (then split off from the Diocese of ’s-Hertogenbosch), is considered as a restoration of the Middelburg see.

Foundations for Middelburg's "stately and picturesque" cathedral (one of only two pre-Reformation cathedrals in The Netherlands, along with St. Martin's in Utrecht) were first laid in the 10th century; additional construction continued through the Middle Ages.

Episcopal ordinaries
(all Roman Rite)

Suffragan Bishops of Middelburg
 Nicolaas van der Borcht (1561.03.10 – death 1573.05.16)
 Jan van Strijen (1576.06.04 – death 1594.07.08)
 Karel-Filips de Rodoan (1600.01.10 – 1603.05.26), later Bishop of Bruges (Belgium) (1569.09.16 – death 1594.05.12).

References

External links and sources 
 GCatholic

Former Roman Catholic dioceses in Europe
History of Catholicism in the Netherlands